St. Agnes Cathedral is a Catholic cathedral in Springfield, Missouri, United States. Along with the Cathedral of St. Mary of the Annunciation in Cape Girardeau, Missouri it is the seat of the Diocese of Springfield-Cape Girardeau.

History

St. Agnes Parish
Catholicism was established in Springfield when Archbishop Peter Richard Kenrick of St. Louis sent Father Graham to the area in 1866. He celebrated the first Mass in the city on March 6 in the home of William Dailey, and then went on to establish Immaculate Conception Parish.

The Atlantic and Pacific Railroad came through Springfield in 1870 and the number of Irish and German immigrants increased the number of Catholics. The railroad tracks also divided the city and crossing them, especially for school children, was considered dangerous. H.A. and L.S. Meyer bought a house south of the tracks at South and Elm Streets. It became St. Agnes Elementary School. The school opened with an enrollment of 35 children and the Sisters of Loretto as teachers. As the Catholic population increased on the south side, Bishop John Joseph Hogan of Kansas City was petitioned to establish a new parish to serve their needs. St. Agnes Parish was established in 1908. The Rev. Dennis J. O’Driscoll arrived on September 18, and the parish leased the vacant Central Congregational Church for the first year.

A new church was dedicated on November 24, 1910, by Bishop Thomas F. Lillis. The school was relocated to the parish property the same year. St. Agnes High School, now Springfield Catholic High School, was established in 1916. The stained glass windows of Our Lady of the Lillies and Saint Agnes were created by Stanley Uthwatt and Bernard Schahuber in 1921. In 1935, a fire in the basement of the church building destroyed the wood floor and a new concrete floor was installed. A new high school building was constructed in 1938. During World War II, the old high school building was used as a U.S.O. Center. After the war, it was used as a parish recreation center before it was torn down. The Solemn High Mass of Christmas in 1954 from St. Agnes was the first televised religious service from a church on Springfield.

St. Agnes Cathedral
In 1956, Pope Pius XII established the Diocese of Springfield-Cape Girardeau. St. Agnes was chosen as the new diocesan cathedral and St. Mary of the Annunciation in Cape Girardeau was chosen as the co-cathedral. St. Louis Auxiliary Bishop Charles Herman Helmsing was chosen as the diocese’s first bishop, and he was installed in St. Agnes Cathedral on November 28.

The present elementary school building was constructed in 1958. St. Agnes Chapel was added to the cathedral in 1986 when the church building underwent a major renovation. The same year, the old elementary building was torn down.

Pastors/Rectors
The following priests have served St. Agnes Parish as Pastor and as Cathedral Rector after 1956:

Rev. Dennis J. O’Driscoll (1908)
Rev. John M. Sheridan (1908–1921)
Rev. Patrick J. Downey (1921–1922)
Rev. L. Curtis Tiernan (1922—1928)
Rev. Robert F. Hayes (1928)
Rev. Rev. Frank D. McCardle (1928–1931)
Rev. Charles A. Dibbins (1931–1935)
Rev. James J. Hally (1935–1937)
Rev. Paul D. Dunn (1937–1944)
Msgr. Valentine A. Schroeger (1944–1966)
Msgr. John H. Westhues (1966–1978)
Msgr. Sylvester H. Bauer (1978–1981)
Msgr. Thomas E. Reidy (1981–1992)
Rev. Thomas P. Kiefer (1992–2003)
Rev. Mike McDevitt (2003-2014)
Rev. Lewis Hejna (2014-present)

See also
List of Catholic cathedrals in the United States
List of cathedrals in the United States

References

External links
 Official Cathedral Site
Roman Catholic Diocese of Springfield-Cape Girardeau Official Site

Christian organizations established in 1908
Roman Catholic churches completed in 1910
Agnes Cathedral (Springfield, Missouri)
Churches in the Roman Catholic Diocese of Springfield–Cape Girardeau
Churches in Springfield, Missouri
Neoclassical architecture in Missouri
1908 establishments in Missouri
20th-century Roman Catholic church buildings in the United States
Neoclassical church buildings in the United States